In the United States, military security parlance, force protection condition (FPCON for short) is a counter-terrorist threat system overseen by the United States Department of Defense directive and describes the number of measures needed to be taken by security agencies in response to various levels of terrorist threats against military facilities, as opposed to DEFCON, which assesses the number of military forces needed to be deployed in a situation with a certain likelihood of an attack against the civilian population. The decision on what level of FPCON to implement is affected by the current threat of terrorism towards military facilities and personnel, the number of security forces available, and current relationships between the United States and the world, which may affect the chances of an attack. FPCON was previously known as THREATCON, until it was renamed in June 2001 due to confusion with the United States State Department system of threat assessment.

Descriptions of FPCONs 
There are five Force Protection Conditions; the commander of U.S. Northern Command determines what the minimum force protection level will be for every American installation in the continental United States. They set the force protection condition level for so many installations because it is the Unified Combatant Command whose geographic area of responsibility is in North America. Other combatant commands, such as U.S. European Command and U.S. Southern Command, set the force protection condition levels for American military installations in their areas of responsibility. Individual facility and installation commanders may increase their local force protection levels as they feel is necessary, but they must adhere to at least the minimum level prescribed by the US Northern Command. Force protection can include procedures as basic as checking identification cards at the entrance to an installation and requiring credentials to get inside a building. However, when necessary, force protection procedures can become as stringent as inspecting every vehicle, person, and bag entering an installation. The five Force Protection Conditions are:

 FPCON NORMAL The Marine definition for FPCON NORMAL is that it applies when a general global threat of possible terrorist activity exists and warrants a routine security posture. At a minimum, access control will be conducted at all DoD installations and facilities. It describes a situation of no terrorist activity. The only security forces needed are enough to stop the average criminal, similar to civilian police forces. (Usually must show only one military ID at base entrance gates.)
 FPCON ALPHA The Marine definition for FPCON ALPHA is that it applies when there is an increased general threat of possible terrorist activity against personnel or facilities, and the nature and extent of the threat are unpredictable. ALPHA measures must be capable of being maintained indefinitely. It describes a situation where there is a small and indefinite threat. Agencies inform personnel that there is a possible threat and a standard security procedure review is conducted. Usually, personnel will be required to show one or two military base IDs at gates, and random vehicle checks and increased crime prevention efforts may also occur.
 FPCON BRAVO The Marine definition for FPCON BRAVO is that it applies when an increased or more predictable threat of terrorist activity exists. Sustaining BRAVO measures for a prolonged period may affect operational capability and military-civil relationships with local authorities. It describes an increasingly likely threat, with info suggesting probable violence but no good confirmation. Precautions would be put in place to deter terrorists, with more guards, stricter inspections, and ID checks.
 FPCON CHARLIE The Marine definition for FPCON CHARLIE is that it applies when an incident occurs or intelligence is received indicating some form of terrorist action or targeting against personnel or facilities is likely. Prolonged implementation of CHARLIE measures may create hardship and affect the activities of the unit and its personnel. It describes a very likely threat. Personnel will be required to show at least two IDs, and (military) traffic routes become restricted. Strong protective measures are put in place, and each installation will be required to continue its mission.
 FPCON DELTA The Marine definition for FPCON DELTA is that it applies to the immediate area where a terrorist attack has occurred or when intelligence has been received that terrorist action against a specific location or person is imminent. This FPCON is usually declared as a localized condition. FPCON DELTA measures are not intended to be sustained for an extended duration. It describes a situation in which an attack is or has taken place. Most of the time it will only occur in vulnerable or attacked areas. Perhaps the most notable example of a general FPCON DELTA is September 11, 2001, all military installations were placed at FPCON DELTA, and restricted to only military personnel. It is a high state of both alert and (if needed) action, deleting and even canceling mission activities.

The key significant difference between FPCON Charlie, and FPCON Delta, is that FPCON Delta references a specific, known threat, whereas FPCON Charlie is used to preparing for imminent threats of a general, non-targeted nature. FPCON Charlie can also be maintained for a significant length of time, several weeks, while FPCON Delta is generally only maintainable for several days.  An FPCON level may also be designated as "+", meaning the facility shall institute extra security measures beyond those specified for the FPCON Level. Generally, this is used to provide an extra layer of security for FPCON Alpha. There is a list of extra security measures that may be initiated for a "+" security level; normally the facility Force Protection NCO will choose two or three for his installation, and switch them out randomly to prevent a predictable response. Some, however, are nearly always used. For instance, 100% ID checks of all incoming persons are almost always used at FPCON Alpha+, while armed fence line patrols may be done for two days, then stopped and replaced with anti-surveillance measures to increase randomness and decrease the predictability of defense.  FPCON levels can also be raised in a non-progressive manner; for example, the FPCON level can jump from FPCON NORMAL to FPCON CHARLIE, completely skipping the ALPHA and BRAVO levels.

In popular culture 
In the 2019 science fiction movie Terminator: Dark Fate, Major Dean declares THREATCON Delta when his group is attacked by a Model Rev-9 Terminator flying a helicopter.

In the 2009 science fiction movie Transformers: Revenge of the Fallen, the US military assumes Condition Delta when they believe that the arrival of multiple Decepticons to Earth is a string of massive terrorist attacks around the world.

In the 2011 science fiction movie Battle: Los Angeles, the US Marines use the term THREATCON Delta when they discover that the "meteors" are actually alien ships.

In a 2003 episode of the political drama The West Wing, "Red Haven's on Fire", President Bartlet orders military bases in Africa and Europe to go to THREATCON Charlie after a suicide bombing.

In a 2003 episode of JAG called "Empty Quiver", a navy base is shown to be on THREATCON Delta after a nuclear warhead goes missing.

See also 

 War portal
 Information Operations Condition
 Force protection
 DEFCON
 REDCON

References 

 DoD Instruction 2000.16, DoD Antiterrorism (AT) Standards, November 17, (used in original piece)
 Force Protection Conditions, January 11, 2023 (the link is right here)

External links 

 US NORTHERN COMMAND Article
 Airman's Handbook
 Force Protection Conditions
 Fort Detrick website explaining

Alert measurement systems
United States Department of Defense